A clarinet concerto is a concerto for clarinet; that is, a musical composition for solo clarinet together with a large ensemble (such as an orchestra or concert band). Albert Rice has identified a work by Giuseppe Antonio Paganelli as possibly the earliest known concerto for solo clarinet; its score appears to be titled "Concerto per il Clareto" and may date from 1733. It may, however, be intended for soprano chalumeau. There are earlier concerti grossi with concertino clarinet parts including two by Johann Valentin Rathgeber, published in 1728.

Famed publishing house Breitkopf & Härtel published the first clarinet concerto in 1772. The instrument's popularity soared and a flurry of early clarinet concertos ensued. Many of these early concertos have largely been forgotten, though German clarinettist Dieter Klocker specialized in these "lost" works. Famous clarinet concertos of the Classical and early Romantic era include those of Wolfgang Amadeus Mozart, Carl Maria von Weber and Louis Spohr.

Relatively few clarinet concertos, or wind instrument concertos generally, were produced during the middle and late Romantic music era, but the form became more popular in the twentieth century, with famous clarinet concertos from Carl Nielsen and Aaron Copland, as well as more recent ones by composers such as John Adams, Kalevi Aho, Elliott Carter, John Corigliano, Magnus Lindberg, Donald Martino, Christopher Rouse, and John Williams.

Baroque period

The modern clarinet did not exist before about 1700. There are, however, a number of concertos written for its antecedent, the chalumeau.

The discovery of six clarinet concertos by Johann Melchior Molter (1696–1765) — the first of which may date from 1743 — and three concerti grossi for clarinet and oboe written by Antonio Vivaldi (1678–1741) as far back as 1711 have led music historians to revise the common view that the first concerto for the instrument was written by Johann Stamitz around 1755.

Classical period
Johann Georg Heinrich Backofen (1768–1830?)
Concerto in B major for clarinet and orchestra, Op.3 (1809?)
Sinfonie Concertante in A major, Op.10 for Two Clarinets and Orchestra (1810?)
Clarinet Concerto in E Major, Opus 16 (1809?)
Clarinet Concerto in E Major, Opus 24 (1821?)
Concerto in F major for Basset-horn and Orchestra
Joseph Beer (1744–1812)
Clarinet Concerto No. 1
Two other clarinet concertos and two double concertos
Matthäus (Frédéric) Blasius (1758–1829)
Concerto No. 1 in C major for Clarinet and Orchestra
Antonio Casimir Cartellieri (1772–1807)
Concerto No. 1 in B major for Clarinet and Orchestra
Concerto No. 2 in B major for Clarinet and Orchestra
Concerto No. 3 in E major for Clarinet and Orchestra
Concerto for Two Clarinets & Orchestra in B Major (1797)
 Bernhard Hendrik Crusell (1775–1838)
 Concerto No. 1 in E major, Op.1 (1807)
 "Grand" Concerto No. 2 in F minor, Op.5 (1815)
 Concerto No. 3 in B major, Op.11 (c.1807–1820)
Sébastien Demar (1763–1832)
Concerto in E major for Clarinet and Orchestra
François Devienne (1759–1803)
Concertino in B major for two Clarinets and Orchestra Op.25
Franz Anton Dimmler (1753–1827)
Concerto in B major for Clarinet and Orchestra
Joseph Leopold Eybler (1765–1846)
Concerto in B major for Clarinet and Orchestra (1798)
Josef Fiala (1748–1816)
Concertante in B major for Clarinet and Cor Anglais
Carl Andreas Göpfert (1768–1818)
Concerto in E Major, Op.14
Concerto in B Major, Op.20
Concerto in E Major, Op.35
Franz Anton Hoffmeister (1754–1812)
Clarinet Concerto in B major for Clarinet and Orchestra (1782–1784?)
Concerto in E major for two Clarinets and Orchestra (1782–1784?)
James Hook (1746–1827)
 Clarinet Concerto in E major (1812), this is actually by Lefèvre, his Concerto No. 3 in E♭ major 
Leopold Kozeluch (1747–1818)
Two clarinet concertos both in E major
Franz Krommer (1759–1831)
Concerto in E Op.36 for clarinet and orchestra (1803)
 Concerto for two clarinets and orchestra in E, Op.35, (1802)
 Concerto for two clarinets and orchestra in E, Op.91 (1815)
Konzertstück for two clarinets and orchestra
Karol Kurpinski (1785–1857)
Concerto for Clarinet and Orchestra (performed 1820) (Grove: Jim Samson)
Ludwig August Lebrun (1752–1790)
Concerto in one movement in B major for Clarinet and Orchestra
Jean-Xavier Lefèvre (1763–1829)
Clarinet Concertos No. 4 and No. 6 (1796)
Peter Joseph von Lindpaintner (1791–1856)
Concertino in E major for Clarinet and Orchestra
John Mahon (c. 1748–1834)
Clarinet Concerto No. 2 in F major
Wolfgang Amadeus Mozart (1756–1791)
Clarinet Concerto (1791)
Sinfonia Concertante in E major for Four Winds (possibly spurious)
Iwan Müller (1786–1854)
Concertante Op.23 in E major for two Clarinets and Military Band
Carlo Paessler (1774–1865)
Concerto con variazioni in E major for Clarinet and Strings
Concerto in C minor for Clarinet and Orchestra
Concerto in B major for Clarinet and Orchestra
Ignaz Pleyel (1757–1831)
Concerto in C major for Clarinet in C
František Xaver Pokorný (1729–1794)
Concerto in B major for Clarinet and Orchestra
Antonín Reicha (1770–1836)
Concerto in G minor for Clarinet and Orchestra
Introduction and Variations on a Theme by Dittersdorf in B major for Clarinet and Orchestra
Carl Gottlieb Reissiger (1798–1859)
Concertino in E major Op.63 for Clarinet and Orchestra
Alessandro Rolla (1757–1841)
Concerto for Bassethorn and Orchestra
Antonio Rosetti (1750–1792)
Concerto No. 1 in E major for Clarinet and Orchestra
Concerto No. 2 in E major for Clarinet and Orchestra
Two additional clarinet concertos
Theodor von Schacht (1748–1823)
Clarinet Concerto in B major for clarinet and orchestra
Georg Abraham Schneider
Concerto No. 1 for basset horn and orchestra, Op.90. (1820?)
Concerto No. 2 for basset horn and orchestra, Op.105.
Pedro Étienne Solère (1753–1817)
Concerto in E major for two Clarinets and Orchestra
Concerto in E major for Clarinet and Orchestra
Concerto Espagnol in B major for Clarinet and Orchestra
Carl Stamitz (1745–1801)
11 Clarinet Concertos
Franz Xaver Süßmayr (1766–1803)
Concerto movement in D major for Basset Clarinet and Orchestra
Franz Tausch (1762–1817)
Concertante Op.26 No. 2 in B major for two Clarinets and Orchestra
Concertante Op.27 No. 1 in B major for two Clarinets and Orchestra
Concerto in E major for Clarinet and Orchestra
Johann Vogel (1756–1788)
Concerto in B Major
Johann Wilhelm Wilms (1772-1847)
 Konzert für Klarinette und Orchester B-Dur, op. 40
Peter von Winter (1754–1825)
Concerto in E major for Clarinet and Orchestra
Michèl Yost (1754–1786)
Concerto No. 11 in B major for Clarinet and Orchestra
Concerto No. 8 in E major for Clarinet and Orchestra
Concerto No. 9 in B major for Clarinet and Orchestra
Concerto No. 7 in B major for Clarinet and Orchestra

Other concertos from the Classical era include those by Deshayes, Fuchs, Jan Kalous, Joseph Lacher, Lang, Philipp Meissner, Pfeilsticker, J.B. Wanhal, Wenzel Pichel, Johan Stich, and J.C. Stumpf.

Romantic period
Heinrich Joseph Bärmann (1784–1847)
Concertstück in G minor for Clarinet and Orchestra
Concertino in C minor for Clarinet and Orchestra
 Concertino in E major Op.27 for Clarinet and Orchestra (1828?)
Carl Bärmann (1810–1885)
Konzertstück for two Clarinets and Orchestra
Concerto Militaire for Clarinet and Orchestra
Max Bruch
Concerto for Clarinet, Viola, and Orchestra in E minor, Op.88 (1910)
Gaetano Donizetti
Concertino for Clarinet and Orchestra in B major
Donato Lovreglio's (1847–1907)
Fantasia Da Concerto Su Motivi De La Traviata (Fantasia for Clarinet and Orchestra on the Opera, La Traviata) for Clarinet and Orchestra (Original music/opera by Giuseppe Verdi)
Felix Mendelssohn (1809–1847)
Concert Piece No. 1 for Clarinet, Basset Horn, and Orchestra in F minor, Op.113 (1833)
Concert Piece No. 2 for Clarinet, Basset Horn, and Orchestra in D minor, Op.114 (1833)
Saverio Mercadante (1795–1870)
Clarinet Concerto in B major
Clarinet Concerto in E major
Julius Rietz (1812–1877)
Concerto in G minor Op.29 for Clarinet and Orchestra (c.1840s)
Nikolai Rimsky-Korsakov (1844–1908)
Concertstück for Clarinet and Military Band (1878)
Gioachino Rossini (1792–1868)
Introduction, Theme and Variations in E major/B major for Clarinet and Orchestra
Variations for Clarinet and Small Orchestra in C major (1809)
Concerto No. 1 in C minor/A major/E major for two Clarinets and Orchestra
Introduction, Theme and Variations in B minor/B major for Clarinet and Orchestra
Fantasie in E major for Clarinet and Orchestra
Concerto No. 2 in E major/A major/E major for two Clarinets and Orchestra
Louis Schindelmeisser (1811–1864)
Sinfonia Concertante for four Clarinets and Orchestra, Op.2 (1833)
Louis Spohr (1784–1859)
Clarinet Concerto No. 1 C Minor, Op.26 (1808)
Clarinet Concerto No. 2 in E Major, Op.57 (1810)
Clarinet Concerto No. 3 in F Minor, WoO 19 (1821)
Clarinet Concerto No. 4 in E Minor, WoO 20 (1828)
Fantasia and Variations on a Theme of Danzi, Op.81
Potpourri for Clarinet and Orchestra in F Major, Op.80 (1811) 
Variations on a Theme from "Alruna" for Clarinet and Orchestra (1809)
Charles Villiers Stanford (1852–1924)
 Clarinet Concerto in A minor Op.80 (1902)
Sergey Ivanovich Taneyev (1856–1915)
Canzona for Clarinet and Strings in F minor
Carl Maria von Weber (1786–1826)
Concertino for clarinet and orchestra
Clarinet Concerto No. 1
Clarinet Concerto No. 2 (all 1811)

20th/21st century
John Adams 
Gnarly Buttons (1996)
Kalevi Aho 
Clarinet Concerto (2005)
Joan Albert Amargós 
Clarinet Concerto
Malcolm Arnold 
Clarinet Concerto No. 1 (1948)
Clarinet Concerto No. 2 (1974)
Jacob Avshalomov 
Evocations, Concerto for Clarinet and Chamber Orchestra
Sérgio Azevedo
Clarinet Concerto (2013)
Nicolas Bacri 
Concerto da Camera Op.61 (1999) for Clarinet and String Orchestra
Jean Balissat 
Cantabile for Clarinet and Strings (1995)
Rusty Banks 
Intangiballistics for Clarinet and Wind Ensemble (2011)
Karol Beffa
Clarinet Concerto (2014)
Michael Berkeley 
Clarinet Concerto (1991)
Leonard Bernstein 
Prelude, Fugue, and Riffs (1946)
Jean Binet 
Petit Concert for Clarinet and Strings (1950)
Howard Blake 
Clarinet Concerto
William Bolcom
Clarinet Concerto (1988)
Jacques Bondon
Concerto d'Octobre for Clarinet and String Orchestra
Concerto des Offrandes for Clarinet and Orchestra
Eugène Bozza 
Concerto for Clarinet and Small Orchestra
Benjamin Britten 
Movement for Clarinet and Orchestra (1942/3)
James Francis Brown
Lost Lanes, Shadow Groves (2008)
Ferruccio Busoni 
Concertino for Clarinet and Chamber Orchestra, Op.48 (1918)
Ann Callaway 
Concerto for Bass Clarinet and Chamber Orchestra (1985–1987)
John Carbon 
Clarinet Concerto (1993)
Elliott Carter 
Clarinet Concerto (1996)
Aexis Chalier 
Concertino for Clarinet and Strings (2001/02)
Arnold Cooke 
Concerto for Clarinet and Orchestra
Aaron Copland 
Clarinet Concerto (1948)
John Corigliano 
Clarinet Concerto (1977)
Peter Maxwell Davies 
Strathclyde Concerto No. 4 (1990)
The Seas of Kirk Swarf for bass clarinet and strings (2007)
Claude Debussy 
Première rhapsodie
 Miguel del Aguila
Clarinet Concerto (1990)
Norman Dello Joio 
Concertante for Clarinet and Orchestra
Edison Denisov 
Concerto for Clarinet and Orchestra (1989)
Daniel Dorff
Summer Solstice for Clarinet and String Orchestra (1994)
Paul Dupré 
Concerto pour clarinette et orchestre (2019)
Einar Englund 
Clarinet Concerto
Dietrich Erdmann
Concerto for bass clarinet and orchestra.
Richard Festinger 
Equinox for Clarinet and Small Orchestra (2009)
Gerald Finzi 
Clarinet Concerto (1949) 
Jean Françaix 
Clarinet Concerto (1968)
Armin Fries 
Concerto for Clarinet and Strings (1956)
Gunnar de Frumerie 
Concerto Op.51 (1957–1958) for Clarinet, Strings, Harp and Percussion
Radamés Gnattali
Choro for Clarinet in B and Orchestra
Berthold Goldschmidt 
Clarinet Concerto
Osvaldo Golijov 
Dreams and Prayers of Isaac the Blind for solo clarinetist (soprano clarinets, basset horn, and bass clarinet) and string quartet, later arranged for solo clarinetist and string orchestra.
Todd Goodman 
Concerto for bass clarinet and orchestra.
Ida Gotkovsky 
Concerto for clarinet and orchestra (1968) or clarinet and wind orchestra (1997)
Concerto lyrique for clarinet and orchestra (1982) or clarinet and wind orchestra (1994)
Kimmo Hakola 
Concerto for Clarinet and Orchestra (2001)
Stephen Hartke 
Concerto for Clarinet and Orchestra "Landscapes with Blues" (2001)
Patrick Hawes 
Clarinet Concerto for Emma Johnson (2015)
Paul Hindemith 
Clarinet Concerto (1947)
Hendrik Hofmeyr 
Clarinet Concerto (2012)
Vadym Homolyaka
Concerto for Clarinet and Orchestra c-moll "Muzychna Ukraina" (1978)
Anthony Iannaccone 
Concertante for Clarinet and Orchestra (1995)
Gordon Jacob 
Mini-concerto for Clarinet and String Orchestra
Shigeru Kan-no 
Bassetklarinette Koncerto (2006)
Ando Kovach 
Concerto for Clarinet and Strings (1995)
Helmut Lachenmann 
Accanto (1976)
Lowell Liebermann 
Concerto for Clarinet and Orchestra Op.110 (2009)
Magnus Lindberg 
Clarinet Concerto (2002)
David Maslanka
Desert Roads: Four Songs for Clarinet and Wind Ensemble (2005)
Scott McAllister
X (1996)
Black Dog (2003)
Free Birds (2009)
Ian McDougall 
Concerto for Clarinet & String Orchestra
William Thomas McKinley 
Concerto for Clarinet No. 3 The Alchemical (1994)
James MacMillan 
Ninian for Clarinet and Orchestra (1996)
Elizabeth Maconchy
Concertino No. 1 for Clarinet and Orchestra
Concertino No. 2 for Clarinet and Orchestra

Dimitris Maronidis
 Clarinet Concerto for Cl, String Orchestra and Electronics (2020)

Donald Martino 
Triple Concerto for clarinet, bass clarinet, and contrabass clarinet.
Rolf Martinsson 
Concert Fantastique Clarinet Concerto No. 1, Op.86 (2010)
Krzysztof Meyer 
Concerto for Clarinet and Orchestra (2002)
Thea Musgrave
Clarinet Concerto (1979)
Concerto for bass clarinet and orchestra
Oscar Navarro
Concert for Clarinet and Orchestra (2006)
Il Concerto for Clarinet and Symphonic Orchestra (2012)
Lior Navok 
Clarinet Concerto (1996),
Carl Nielsen 
Clarinet Concerto (1928)
Jim Parker 
Concerto for Clarinet and Strings
Krzysztof Penderecki 
Clarinet Concerto
Lorenzo Perosi 
Concerto per clarinetto e orchestra
Lyubomir Pipkov 
Concerto for Clarinet and Chamber Orchestra
Walter Piston 
Concerto for Clarinet and Orchestra (1967)
Marcel Poot 
Concerto for Clarinet and Orchestra (1977)
Claudio Puntin
Aroma, for solo Clarinet, Bass Clarinet, Electronics and Orchestra (2016)
Kevin Puts 
Clarinet Concerto with Strings, Harp, and Percussion (2008–9)
Einojuhani Rautavaara 
Clarinet Concerto (2001)
Alan Rawsthorne 
Concerto for Clarinet and String Orchestra
Andrew Rindfleisch 
The Light Fantastic for bass clarinet and wind ensemble (2003)
Jean Rivier 
Concerto for Clarinet and String Orchestra
Paul Rosenbloom 
Concertante Variations for Clarinet and Chamber Orchestra.
Christopher Rouse 
Clarinet Concerto (2000)
Jonathan Russell 
Bass Clarinet Double Concerto (2007)
Bass Clarinet Concerto (2014)
Josef Schelb 
Concerto for bass clarinet and orchestra.
Armin Schibler 
Concertino for Clarinet and Strings Op.49 (1956)
Tobias Schwencke 
Concerto for Clarinet solo and 15 Strings
Mátyás Seiber 
Concertino for Clarinet and String Orchestra
Elie Siegmeister 
Clarinet Concerto
Frederick Speck 
Concerto for Clarinet and Orchestra (1993)
Yevhen Stankovych
Concerto for Clarinet solo
Frank Graham Stewart 
Concerto for B Clarinet and Orchestra (1993)
Igor Stravinsky 
Ebony Concerto for clarinet and jazz band (1945)
Aurel Stroe 
Concerto for Clarinet and Orchestra
Toru Takemitsu 
Fantasma/Cantos for clarinet and orchestra
Josef Tal 
Concerto for clarinet and orchestra
Alexandre Tansman 
Concertino for Oboe, Clarinet and Strings (1952)
Clarinet Concerto (1957)
İstemihan Taviloğlu 
Concerto for Clarinet and Orchestra
Boris Tchaikovsky 
Concerto for clarinet and chamber orchestra (1957)
Frank Ticheli 
Clarinet Concerto (2010)
Franz Tischhauser 
The Beggar's Concerto for Clarinet and Strings
Henri Tomasi 
Concerto for Clarinet and String Orchestra
Clarinet Concerto (2016)
Joan Tower 
Clarinet Concerto (1988)
August Verbesselt 
Concerto for Clarinet and Orchestra (1982)
Sándor Veress 
Clarinet Concerto
Rolf Wallin 
Clarinet Concerto (1998)
Douglas Weiland 
Clarinet Concerto, Op.30 (2001)
Norma Wendelburg 
Concerto for Clarinet and Orchestra
John Williams 
Clarinet Concerto for Michele Zukovsky (1991)
Isang Yun 
Clarinet Concerto (1981)
Marcin Zielinski 
Concertino for Clarinet Solo and Strings
Marilyn J. Ziffrin 
Clarinet Concerto
Ellen Taaffe Zwilich
Clarinet Concerto (2002)

See also
List of concert works for saxophone
Oboe concerto
Bassoon concerto

Notes

External links
 UNM clarinet repertoire list
 John Williams Clarinet Concerto